(literally: 'Egyptian Grammar') is a grammar reference book by the French Egyptologist Jean-François Champollion, published posthumously in France in 1836. Its full title, the Grammaire égyptienne ou Principes généraux de l'écriture sacrée égyptienne appliqué à la présentation de la langue parlée means Egyptian Grammar or General Principles of Egyptian Sacred Writing Applied to the Presentation of the Spoken Language.

Origins 
Upon his return from Egypt to France on 5 March 1830, after almost twenty months of absence, Champollion immediately gave priority to the clarification of his Grammaire. It was his brother, Jacques-Joseph Champollion, who would handle its publication in 1836. Marcellin Jobard, a lithographer from Brussels, whom claimed to have advised Champollion the use of lithography for the printing of the Grammaire égyptienne. The printing combines lithography and typography, with lithographic stone transfer methods improved by Jules Feuquières, used by 's lithographic workshop in Paris, which was responsible for the lithographic printing process of the Grammaire.

Grammaire points out that the Egyptian hieroglyphs are a complex system, writing figurative, symbolic, and phonetic all at once. This work went hand in hand with the Dictionnaire égyptien en écriture hiéroglyphique, another work by Champollion which was also published posthumously by his brother in 1841. The aim of Dictionnaire égyptien was to create a complete method of learning hieroglyphic writing. Émile Prisse d'Avennes, a French engineer, became Egyptologist after studying Grammaire égyptienne.

Hieroglyphics 
Grammaire égyptienne contains many hieroglyphs in a rather particular style.

Editions 
There are many editions of this work, notably:
 Grammaire égyptienne ou Principes généraux de l'écriture sacrée égyptienne appliqué à la présentation de la langue parlée, Firmin-Didot Frères, 1836
 Principes généraux de l'écriture sacrée Égyptienne, Institut d'Orient, 1984, 
 Grammaire égyptienne, Solin, 1997, 
 Grammaire égyptienne, Actes Sud, 1998, 555 pages,

Bibliography 
 Marie-Christine Claes, "Autour de la Grammaire égyptienne de Champollion : Marcellin Jobard, Charles Motte et Jules Feuquières, utilisateurs de la lithographie pour l'impression des hiéroglyphes", from Bulletin des Musées royaux d'Art et d'Histoire, Brussels, volume 82, 2011 [2013], pp. 55–99.

Gallery

References

External links 
 Grammaire égyptienne Online (1836 edition) 

1836 books
Grammar books
Egyptology books
Egyptian hieroglyphs